Joan Louise Oates, FBA ( Lines; 6 May 1928 – 3 February 2023) was an American-British archaeologist and academic, specialising in the Ancient Near East. From 1971 to 1995, she was a fellow and tutor of Girton College, Cambridge and a lecturer at the University of Cambridge. From 1995, she was a Senior Research Fellow of the McDonald Institute for Archaeological Research. Since 2004, she has been director of the excavations of Tell Brak; she was Co-Director, with her husband David Oates, between 1988 and 2004.

Personal life
Oates was born in Watertown, New York on 6 May 1928, to Harold Burdette Lines and Beatrice Naomi Lines. She obtained a BA degree at Syracuse University in New York, before winning a Fulbright Scholarship to study for a PhD at Girton College, Cambridge, which she received in 1953.

While participating in the excavation of Nimrud, she met David Oates (1927–2004). They married in 1956 and together had three children. They collaborated on a number of archaeological publications and excavations.

Oates died on 3 February 2023, at the age of 94. Her funeral was held at Girton College Chapel on 23 February 2023.

Academic career
Oates began her career as an assistant curator at the Metropolitan Museum of Art in New York City. She married David Oates in 1956 and, as was expected of her, she gave up her career to support her husband. She held a Guggenheim Fellowship from 1966 to 1967. In 1971, she was elected a fellow of Girton College, Cambridge. She was additionally a lecturer in the history and archaeology of the Ancient Near East at the University of Cambridge from 1989. In 1995, she retired from full-time academia and was made a life fellow of Girton College. She was a senior fellow of the McDonald Institute for Archaeological Research at Cambridge from 1995.

From 1951, Oates was involved in archaeological excavation in Iraq and Syria. She took part in the excavations of Tell Brak from 1981, and was also involved in those at Choga Mami, Nippur and Nimrud. She was co-director with her husband David of the excavations at Tell Brak from 1988 to 2004, and she was its sole director after his death in 2004.

Honours
In 2004, Oates was elected a Fellow of the British Academy (FBA), the United Kingdom's national academy for the humanities and social sciences. In 2014, she was awarded the Grahame Clark Medal for Prehistoric Archaeology by the British Academy. The citation read: "to recognise her reputation as one of the leading authorities on Mesopotamian prehistory as well as her fundamental contributions to our understanding of ancient Near Eastern Civilisation."

Selected works

References

1928 births
2023 deaths
American archaeologists
American women archaeologists
Alumni of Girton College, Cambridge
Fellows of Girton College, Cambridge
Archaeologists of the Near East
Fellows of the British Academy
21st-century American women
Fulbright alumni